Victor A. Rizzolo (December 30, 1923 – November 11, 2017) was an American politician who served in the New Jersey General Assembly from 1973 to 1976.

Born and raised in Newark, New Jersey, he graduated from Barringer High School in 1941, before serving with the United States Army in Europe during World War II.

After Millicent Fenwick resigned from her Assembly seat on December 14, 1972, to become head of the New Jersey Division of Consumer Affairs, Rizzolo won a special election on January 30, 1973, to complete her term representing the 8th Legislative District.

He died on November 11, 2017, in Lyons, New Jersey at age 93.

References

External links

|-

1923 births
2017 deaths
American military personnel of World War II
Barringer High School alumni
Politicians from Somerset County, New Jersey
Republican Party members of the New Jersey General Assembly
Politicians from Newark, New Jersey